World Gone Wild is a 1988 science fiction film directed by Lee H. Katzin, and starring Bruce Dern, Catherine Mary Stewart and Michael Paré.

Plot 
In the nuclear-ravaged wasteland of Earth in the year 2087, rain has not fallen for fifty years and water is as precious as life itself. The isolated town of Lost Wells, an outpost that survived the holocaust, is led by Ethan, a Moses-like guru and the last schoolteacher on the planet, Angie. The inhabitants of the town guard the secret of their existence and source of their water from the outside world. The "town" consist of a Mobil station surrounded by a wall of old cars. The school takes place in an old school bus. One of the few books still in existence and held by the town is an unabridged book on etiquette by Emily Post. An evil cult of pseudoreligious renegades led by Derek, a group following the teachings in a book on Charles Manson discovers the existence of the water source and wants control of the town's valuable water supply. As the villagers are no match for Derek's brute military force, they hire mercenaries living in a distant city. That group includes Nitro, Ten Watt and they are led by George Landon. The townspeople and the mercenaries team up to stage a last ditch defense of the town.

Cast 
 Bruce Dern as Ethan
 Michael Paré as George Landon
 Catherine Mary Stewart as Angie
 Adam Ant as Derek Abernathy
 Anthony James as Ten Watt
 Rick Podell as Exline
 Julius Carry as Nitro (credited as Julius J. Carry III)
 Alan Autry as Hank
 Mindy McEnnan as Kate
 Bryan J. Thompson as Matthew 
 Nancy Parsons as Rape Victim

Production 
The film was commissioned by Apollo Pictures in 1986, although it was ultimately released by Lorimar Studios. Principal photography began in Arizona in March 1987. Originally the book used by Derek's cult was to be L. Ron Hubbard's Dianetics: The Modern Science of Mental Health, but the book was changed to a book about Charles Manson after the Church of Scientology threatened a lawsuit.

Reception 
The film was nominated for a Young Artist Award in 1989. It received two out of five stars in Creature Feature. Dern was praised by Lee H. Katzin, but the source material was found lacking. The film was found to be a mix of Mad Max and The Magnificent Seven. Similarly, The Washington Post found the script lacking. The New York Times found the movie to be a standard-issue, post-apocalyptic film in the vein of Mad Max, although the attempts at dark humor were appreciated. Similarly, Kim Newman found the movie to stand out over other post-apocalyptic works due to its offbeat humor and its use of western motifs. The LA Times likes the movie, citing the Seven Samurai homage and finding it surprisingly reflective. They likewise appreciated the humor and musical score of the movie.

References

External links 
 
 

1988 films
1980s science fiction action films
American science fiction action films
Films directed by Lee H. Katzin
Films set in 2087
American post-apocalyptic films
Films about water scarcity
Films about nuclear war and weapons
Films shot in Arizona
1980s English-language films
1980s American films